Kulsoom Akhtar Chandio is a Pakistani politician who had been a Member of the Provincial Assembly of Sindh, from 2008 to May 2018.

Education
She has done Bachelor of Science, Bachelor of Laws and Master of Arts in Economics.

Political career
She was elected to the Provincial Assembly of Sindh as a candidate of Pakistan Peoples Party (PPP) on a reserved seat for women in 2008 Pakistani general election.

She was re-elected to the Provincial Assembly of Sindh as a candidate of PPP on a reserved seat for women in 2013 Pakistani general election.

She was re-elected to the Provincial Assembly of Sindh as a candidate of PPP on a reserved seat for women in 2018 Pakistani general election.

References

Living people
Sindh MPAs 2013–2018
Pakistan People's Party politicians
Sindh MPAs 2008–2013
Pakistan People's Party MPAs (Sindh)
Year of birth missing (living people)